Madagascarchaea is a genus of assassin spiders first described by H. M. Wood & N. Scharff in 2018.

Species
 it contains eighteen species:
Madagascarchaea ambre (Wood, 2008) — Madagascar
Madagascarchaea anabohazo (Wood, 2008) — Madagascar
Madagascarchaea borimontsina (Wood, 2008) — Madagascar
Madagascarchaea fohy Wood & Scharff, 2018 — Madagascar
Madagascarchaea gracilicollis (Millot, 1948) — Madagascar
Madagascarchaea griswoldi (Wood, 2008) — Madagascar
Madagascarchaea halambohitra (Wood, 2008) — Madagascar
Madagascarchaea jeanneli (Millot, 1948) — Madagascar
Madagascarchaea lavatenda (Wood, 2008) — Madagascar
Madagascarchaea legendrei (Platnick, 1991) — Madagascar
Madagascarchaea lotzi Wood & Scharff, 2018 — Madagascar
Madagascarchaea moramora Wood & Scharff, 2018 — Madagascar
Madagascarchaea namoroka (Wood, 2008) — Madagascar
Madagascarchaea rabesahala Wood & Scharff, 2018 — Madagascar
Madagascarchaea spiceri (Wood, 2008) — Madagascar
Madagascarchaea tsingyensis (Lotz, 2003) — Madagascar
Madagascarchaea vadoni (Millot, 1948) — Madagascar
Madagascarchaea voronakely (Wood, 2008) — Madagascar

References

External links

Araneomorphae genera
Archaeidae